Ossipee is an incorporated town in northwestern Alamance County in the U.S. state of North Carolina. Ossipee is one of the newer municipalities in the state, as it was incorporated officially on December 9, 2002. It was part of the Altamahaw-Ossipee census-designated place until its incorporation. The town had a 2010 population of 543. The town belongs to the Piedmont Triad metropolitan area.

Demographics

References

Towns in North Carolina
Towns in Alamance County, North Carolina